The Tuncurry II was a wooden carvel screw steamer built in 1909 at Tuncurry, Australia.

The ship was designed to enable navigation of the shallow bars when entering estuaries. Also for general cargo and the accommodation for 21 saloon class passengers. In the 1930s, the ship was used as a collier.

In 1921 at Tuncurry, the ship was lengthened by almost twenty feet by Ernest Wright, son of John Wright.

The Tuncurry II was used by the Royal Australian Navy to transport cargo. A Vickers machine gun was fitted at Garden Island. The ship was purchased by the Commonwealth for the navy in 1944 and sold in 1946.

A vessel with a similar name operated at much the same time,  and so the Tuncurry (1903) ex Tokelau should not be confused with the Tuncurry (1909).

References

External links

Ships built in New South Wales
1909 ships
Coastal trading vessels of Australia
Wooden steamships of Australia